Fiachnae mac Ainbítha (died 886) or Fiachna mac Ainfítha was a Dál Fiatach king of Ulaid, which is now Ulster, Ireland. He was the son of Ainbíth mac Áedo (died 882),a previous king of Ulaid. He ruled briefly in 886.
 
In 883 he was responsible for the killing of his uncle Eochocán mac Áedo, leth-rí (half-king or co-ruler) of Ulaid jointly with his other uncle, Airemón mac Áedo (died 886). Fiachnae succeeded Airemón as sole king in 886 but was promptly killed by his own associates.

Notes

References

 Byrne, Francis John (2001), Irish Kings and High-Kings, Dublin: Four Courts Press,

External links
CELT: Corpus of Electronic Texts at University College Cork

Kings of Ulster
9th-century Irish monarchs
886 deaths
Year of birth unknown